Flirtin' with Disaster is the second studio album by American rock band Molly Hatchet, released in 1979 by Epic Records. The album was re-issued in 2001 with four bonus tracks. It is their best-selling album.

The cover is a painting by Frank Frazetta entitled "Dark Kingdom."

Track listing 
Side one
 "Whiskey Man" (Danny Joe Brown, Bruce Crump, Dave Hlubek, Steve Holland) – 3:38
 "It's All Over Now" (Bobby Womack, Shirley Jean Womack) – 3:40 (The Valentinos cover)
 "One Man's Pleasure" (Brown, Hlubek, Duane Roland) – 3:24
 "Jukin' City" (Brown, Hlubek, Holland) – 3:46
 "Boogie No More" (Brown, Crump, Hlubek, Holland, Roland, Banner Thomas) – 6:08

Side two
 "Flirtin' with Disaster" (Brown, Hlubek, Thomas) – 5:00
 "Good Rockin'" (Brown, Crump, Hlubek, Holland, Roland, Thomas) – 3:17
 "Gunsmoke" (Crump, Roland) – 3:11
 "Long Time" (Brown, Hlubek, Holland) – 3:19
 "Let the Good Times Roll" (Brown, Hlubek, Holland) – 2:56

2001 Bonus tracks
"Silver and Sorrow" (Brown, Crump, Hlubek, Holland, Roland, Thomas) – 3:36 (demo)
 "Flirtin' with Disaster" (Brown, Hlubek, Thomas) – 6:15 (live from Jacksonville, FL in 1980)
 "One Man's Pleasure" (Brown, Hlubek, Roland) – 3:16 (live from Jacksonville, FL in 1980)
 "Cross Road Blues" (Robert Johnson) – 4:13 (live from Jacksonville, FL in 1980)

Personnel
Molly Hatchet
Danny Joe Brown –  vocals
Dave Hlubek – guitar
Steve Holland – guitar
Duane Roland – guitar
Banner Thomas – bass guitar
Bruce Crump – drums

Additional musicians
Max Carl – background vocals on track 2
Tom Werman – percussion
Jai Winding – keyboard

Production
Tom Werman – producer
Gary Ladinsky – engineer, mixing
Bill Vermillion, Cary Pritkin – assistant engineers
George Marino – mastering at Sterling Sound, New York
Pat Armstrong – executive producer, direction

Charts

Weekly charts

Year-end charts

Singles

Certifications

References

Molly Hatchet albums
1979 albums
Albums produced by Tom Werman
Epic Records albums
Albums with cover art by Frank Frazetta